Karl Wolter (2 August 1894 – 19 April 1959) was a German international footballer.

References

1894 births
1959 deaths
Association football forwards
German footballers
Germany international footballers